Mokhlesur Rahman Mia is a Bangladesh Nationalist Party politician. He was elected a member of parliament from Rangpur-23 in the 1979 Bangladeshi general election.

Career 
Mokhlesur Rahman Mia was elected a Member of Parliament from Rangpur-23 constituency as an Bangladesh Nationalist Party candidate in the 1979 Bangladeshi general election.

References 

Living people
Year of birth missing (living people)
Bangladesh Nationalist Party politicians
2nd Jatiya Sangsad members